Erigeron pygmaeus is a species of flowering plant in the family Asteraceae known by the common name pygmy fleabane, or pygmy daisy.

Erigeron pygmaeus is native to eastern California and western Nevada, in the Sierra Nevada, the White Mountains, and a few other nearby ranges. It grows at high elevations in mountain forests, flats, and talus.

Erigeron pygmaeus is a very small daisy, rarely exceeding 6 centimeters (2.4 inches) in height. It forms clumps of hairy, glandular foliage with leaves under four centimeters (1.6 inches) in length. The inflorescence consists of a single small flower head with dark phyllaries. Each head contains 20–37 blue or purple (rarely white) ray florets surrounding many golden yellow disc florets .

References

External links
Jepson Manual Treatment
United States Department of Agriculture Plants Profile
Calphotos Photo gallery, University of California

pygmaeus
Flora of California
Plants described in 1873
Flora of Nevada
Flora without expected TNC conservation status